United Nations Security Council resolution 1104, adopted unanimously on 8 April 1997, after recalling 808 (1993) and 827 (1993) and considering the nominations for Judges of the International Criminal Tribunal for the former Yugoslavia received by the Secretary-General Kofi Annan by 13 March 1997, the council established a list of candidates in accordance with Article 13 of the Statute of the International Tribunal to be forwarded to the General Assembly.

The list of nominations was as follows:

Masoud Mohamed Al-Amri (Qatar)
George Randolph Tissa Dias Bandaranayake (Sri Lanka)
Antonio Cassese (Italy)
Babiker Zain Elabideen Elbashir (Sudan)
Saad Saood Jan (Pakistan)
Claude Jorda (France)
Adolphus Godwin Karibi-Whyte (Nigeria)
Richard George May (United Kingdom)
Gabrielle Kirk McDonald (United States)
Florence Ndepele Mwachande Mumba (Zambia)
Rafael Nieto Navia (Colombia)
Daniel David Ntanda Nsereko (Uganda)
Elizabeth Odio Benito (Costa Rica)
Fouad Abdel-Moneim Riad (Egypt)
Almiro Simtes Rodrigues (Portugal)
Mohamed Shahabuddeen (Guyana)
Jan Skupinski (Poland)
Wang Tieya (China)
Lal Chand Vohrah (Malaysia)

11 of the 19 nominations would be elected to the Court.

See also
 Bosnian War
 Breakup of Yugoslavia
 Croatian War of Independence
 List of United Nations Security Council Resolutions 1101 to 1200 (1997–1998)
 Yugoslav Wars

References

External links
 
Text of the Resolution at undocs.org

 1104
 1104
 1104
April 1997 events